SM U-68 was a Type U 66 submarine or U-boat for the German Imperial Navy during the First World War. She had been laid down in December 1913 as U-9 of the U-7 class for the Austro-Hungarian Navy ( or ) but was sold to Germany, along with the others in her class, in November 1914. Under German control, the class became known as the U 66 type and the boats were renumbered; U-9 became U-68, and was redesigned and reconstructed to German specifications. She was launched in June 1915 and commissioned in August.

U-68 sank no ships in her brief career. A post-war German study found fault with U-68s captain for not following established procedures for avoiding decoy ships.

Design and construction 
After the Austro-Hungarian Navy had competitively evaluated three foreign submarine designs, it selected the Germaniawerft 506d design, also known as the Type UD, for its new U-7 class  of five submarines. The Navy ordered five boats on 1 February 1913.

The U-7 class was seen by the Austro-Hungarian Navy as an improved version of its U-3 class, which was also a Germaniawerft design. As designed for the Austro-Hungarian Navy, the boats were to displace  on the surface and  while submerged. The boats were designed with five  torpedo tubes; four located in the bow, one in the stern. The boats' armament was to also include a single  L/26 deck gun.

U-9 was laid down on 31 December 1913, the third of the U-7 boats. Her construction was slated to be complete within 29 to 33 months. Neither U-9 nor any of her sister boats were complete when World War I began in August 1914. With the boats under construction at Kiel, the Austrians became convinced that it would be impossible to take delivery of the boats, which would need to be towed into the Mediterranean past Gibraltar, a British territory. As a result, U-9 and her four sisters were sold to the Imperial German Navy on 28 November 1914.

U-9 was renumbered by the Germans as U-68 when her class was redesignated as the Type U 66. The torpedo load was increased by a third, from 9 to 12, and the deck gun was upgraded from the  gun originally specified to an  SK L/30 one.

Service career 
U-68 was launched on 1 June 1915. On 17 August, SM U-68 was commissioned into the Imperial German Navy under the command of Kapitänleutnant Ludwig Güntzel, a new submarine commander. On 29 November, U-68 was assigned to the IV. U-Halbflotille.

U-68 departed the Ems on 16 March 1916 to begin her first war patrol. Headed to her assigned operating area off Britain's west coast, Güntzel and U-68 came across , a British Q-ship—in appearance unarmed—under the command of Gordon Campbell. At approximately 07:00, U-68 fired a torpedo at Farnborough and narrowly missed the ship's bow. Farnborough continued the deception and continued on at her same speed and course. At 07:20, U-68 surfaced about  astern of Farnborough, moved to the ship's port quarter, and fired a shot across the Q-ship's bow.

Farnborough stopped, blew off steam, and launched a boat to simulate a surrender. The British gunners scored several hits on the U-boat out of 21 rapidly fired rounds. As U-68 began to sink, Campbell steered Farnborough over U-68s location and dropped a depth charge that blew the bow of the submarine out of the water. As U-68 began going down by the stern, Farnboroughs gunners scored another five hits on the U-boat's conning tower. U-68 sank no ships during her brief service career.

A post-war German study faulted U-68s commander, Kptlt. Güntzel, for failing to follow established procedures for dealing with neutral-flagged vessels in order to avoid decoy ships like Farnborough. According to the report, Güntzel had broken almost all the rules when approaching Farnborough. However, Kommodore Hermann Bauer, the commander of the German High Seas Fleet U-boats, in his post-war memoirs, reports Güntzel was an inexperienced captain and had not, contrary to usual practice, been first sent to sea under a more experienced U-boat captain to gain knowledge.

Notes

References

Bibliography

External links

Photos of cruises of German submarine U-54 in 1916–1918.
A 44 min. German film from 1917 about a cruise of the German submarine U-35.
Room 40:  original documents, photos and maps about World War I German submarine warfare and British Room 40 Intelligence from The National Archives, Kew, Richmond, UK.

German Type U 66 submarines
U-boats commissioned in 1915
Maritime incidents in 1916
U-boats sunk in 1916
World War I submarines of Germany
U-boats sunk by British warships
World War I shipwrecks in the Atlantic Ocean
1915 ships
Ships built in Kiel
Shipwrecks of Ireland